Leontine Hippius (1868 – after 1941) was an Estonian politician.

During World War I, she was a member of the Estl. Damenkomitee d. R. K., for the care of Estonian prisoners of war in Germany and Austria-Hungary, and a society for the care of Baltic-German prisoners, among others.

From 1917 to 1939, she was a member of the council of the governmental Estonian public welfare committee.

She was arrested and taken away in 1941 and never heard from again.

References
Baltisches Biographisches Lexikon digital 

1868 births
Year of death unknown
19th-century Estonian people
Baltic-German people
20th-century Estonian politicians
20th-century Estonian women politicians
20th-century Estonian women
19th-century Estonian women